The American Girl is a 2005 novel by author Monika Fagerholm. It won the August Prize in 2005.

References

2005 novels
Swedish-language novels
August Prize-winning works
21st-century Finnish novels
Albert Bonniers Förlag books